Shubi may refer to:
the Shubi people
the Shubi language